is a passenger railway station located in the city of Takashima, Shiga Prefecture, Japan, operated by the West Japan Railway Company (JR West).

Lines

Station layout
The station consists of two opposed elevated side platforms with the station building underneath. The station is staffed.

Platforms

Adjacent Stations

History
The station opened on 20 July 1974 as a station on the Japan National Railway (JNR). The station became part of the West Japan Railway Company on 1 April 1987 due to the privatization and dissolution of the JNR. 

Station numbering was introduced in March 2018 with Makino being assigned station number JR-B12.

Passenger statistics
In fiscal 2019, the station was used by an average of 309 passengers daily (boarding passengers only).

Surrounding area
 Lake Biwa
Japan National Route 161

See also
List of railway stations in Japan

References

External links

JR West official home page

Railway stations in Shiga Prefecture
Railway stations in Japan opened in 1974
Kosei Line
Takashima, Shiga